The Running Mates: Human Rights is a 2019 South Korean television series starring Lee Yo-won and Choi Gwi-hwa. Based on the 2015 novel of the same name by Song Shi-woo, it aired on OCN's Wednesdays and Thursdays at 23:00 KST time slot from September 18 to October 31, 2019.

Synopsis
The series follows a group of investigators who work for South Korea's Human rights commission.

Cast

Main
 Lee Yo-won as Han Yoon-seo
 Choi Gwi-hwa as Bae Hong-tae

Supporting

Human rights commission
 Jang Hyun-sung as Kim Hyun-seok
 Oh Mi-hee as Ahn Kyeong-sook
 Kim Joo-young as Bu Ji-hoon
 Lee Joo-woo as Lee Dal-sook

Others
 Shim Ji-ho as Oh Tae-moon
 Jang Hyuk-jin as Jang Dong-seok
 Kim Roi-ha as Han Gwang-ho
 Jo Soo-min as Han Yoon-jin
 Ryu Sung-rok as Jung Il-byung
 Park Bo-kyung as Jin Jin-nyeo
 Gu Ja-geon as Koo Ja-keon

Production
The first script reading took place in June 2019.

On October 14, it was announced that the total number of episodes was reduced from 16 to 14.

Ratings
In this table,  represent the lowest ratings and  represent the highest ratings.

References

External links
  
 The Running Mates: Human Rights at Studio Dragon 
 The Running Mates: Human Rights at Daydream Entertainment 
 
 

OCN television dramas
Korean-language television shows
2019 South Korean television series debuts
2019 South Korean television series endings
Television series by Studio Dragon
Television shows based on South Korean novels